Aundh may refer to
 Aundh State, a princely state in British India
 Aundh Experiment, an early test of village-level self-government in British India
 Aundh, Satara, Satara District, Maharashtra, India
 Aundh, Pune, suburb of Pune, Maharashtra, India